Comitas ensyuensis is a species of sea snails, a marine gastropod mollusc in the family Pseudomelatomidae, the turrids and allies

Description
The length of the shell varies between 70 mm and 95 mm.

Distribution
This marine species occurs off Japan and the Philippines.

References

 Shikama T. (1977). Descriptions of new and noteworthy Gastropoda from western Pacific and Indian Oceans. Science Reports of the Yokohama National University, section II (Geology). 24: 1-23, 5 pls. page(s): 18

External links
 
 
 Biolib.cz: Comitas ensyuensis

ensyuensis
Gastropods described in 1977